Gage Hecht (born February 18, 1998) is an American cyclist, who currently rides for UCI ProTeam . Hecht is the founder of the Waffle House Tour bicycle event.

Major results

Road

2015
 National Junior Road Championships
2nd Road race
3rd Time trial
2016
 National Junior Road Championships
1st  Road race
3rd Time trial
2017
 1st Stage 4 Redlands Bicycle Classic
 2nd Road race, National Under-23 Road Championships
2018
 1st  Time Trial, National Under-23 Road Championships
 1st Stage 1 Colorado Classic
 5th Time trial, National Road Championships
 6th Chrono Kristin Armstrong
2019
 2nd Time trial, National Under-23 Road Championships
 6th Chrono Kristin Armstrong
2021
 2nd Overall Joe Martin Stage Race
1st Stage 3 (ITT) 
 2nd Schwalbe TCM HLB van Daal Eurode Omloop

Cyclo-cross

2014–2015
 1st  Pan American Junior Championships
 1st  National Junior Championships
 1st Providence Junior CX Festival
 1st Duinencross Koksijde Juniors
 2nd Azencross Juniors
2015–2016
 1st  National Junior Championships
 2nd  Pan American Junior Championships
2016–2017
 1st US Open of Cyclocross Under-23
 2nd  Pan American Under-23 Championships
 2nd National Under-23 Championships
2017–2018
 1st  Pan American Under-23 Championships
 1st US Open of Cyclocross Under-23 Day 1 & 2
 1st Major Taylor 'Cross Cup Day 1
 2nd Major Taylor 'Cross Cup Day 2
 2nd Harbin Park International
 2nd Derby City Cup
 2nd Ruts n' Guts Day 2
 3rd Ruts n' Guts Day 1
2018–2019
 1st  Pan American Under-23 Championships
 1st Silver Goose Cyclocross Festival
 Cincinnati UCI Cyclocross
1st Devou Park
2nd Carter Park
 1st US Open of Cyclocross Day 1
 1st Ruts 'n' Guts 1 & 2
 1st Resolution 'Cross Cup 1 & 2
 3rd National Championships
2019–2020
 1st  National Championships
 1st  Pan American Under-23 Championships
 2nd Silver Goose Cyclocross Festival
 2nd Cincinnati UCI Cyclocross - Kingswood Park
 2nd US Open of Cyclocross Day 1 & 2
 2nd FayetteCross 2
2021–2022
 1st North Carolina Grand Prix Day 1
 3rd National Championships

References

External links

1998 births
Living people
American male cyclists
Cyclo-cross cyclists
American cyclo-cross champions
Sportspeople from New Orleans